Mystery is a 2014 Chinese suspense thriller adventure film directed by Wu Bing. It was released on November 14, 2014.

Cast
Ady An
Jiro Wang
Guo Degang
Ning Huanyu 
Julie Tan

Reception

Box office
By November 21, 2014, the film had earned ¥4.58 million at the Chinese box office.

References

2010s adventure thriller films
Chinese suspense films
Chinese adventure thriller films